Pencoed Rugby Football Club is a Welsh rugby union team based in Pencoed. Today, Pencoed RFC plays in the Welsh Rugby Union, Division Two West League and is a feeder club for the Ospreys.

The team badge consists of a shield containing the lamb of god carrying a St George's standard. The shield is topped by the Prince of Wales three feathers.

Pencoed RFC was established in 1888 with the clubhouse situated on the eastern edge of Felindre Rd. In 1980 the Mini & Junior section was formed. Pencoed RFC takes pride in being the home club of Welsh internationals Gareth Thomas, Gareth Cooper, and Gavin Henson plus recently retired three times British Lion Scott Gibbs, all of whom progressed through the junior and youth teams to perform with distinction on the world stage.

International honours
Gareth Thomas
Gareth Cooper
Gavin Henson
Scott Gibbs
Wayne Hall
Gareth Jones
Nathan Thomas
Gareth Williams
Adrian Davies
James Bater
Hugh Williams-Jones
Tommy Reffell
Sam Costelow

British and Irish Lions
Gareth Thomas
Gavin Henson
Scott Gibbs
Gareth Cooper

Current squad
 Kieron Moore
 Jack Jones (C)
 Christian Powell
 Nicky Hawkins
 Andrew Shillam
 James Murphy
 Chris Howells
 Paul McFarlane
 Justin Russell
 Aaron Halse
 Thomas Burke
 Gareth Prentice
 David Pearson
 Liam Evans
 Tom Davies
 Ben Read
 Marc Davies
 Geoff Hobbs
 Stein Jones
 Glenn Hiscocks
 Aaron Songhurst
 Liam Evans
 Ken Morris (Capt.)
 Tom Cross
 Paul Richards
 Tom Drew
 Robert Spear
 Jamie Williams
 Ywain Shakespeare
 Liam Halse
 Anthony Morris
 Mike Rowe
 Rhys Davey
 Gary Money
 Ashley Halse

Club honours
 WRU Division Three South East Champions 2006–07

References

Welsh rugby union teams
Rugby clubs established in 1888
Sport in Bridgend County Borough
Pencoed